Sun Alliance Group plc was a large insurance business with its main offices in the City of London and later Horsham. It was created in 1959 by the merger of Sun Insurance, founded in 1710, and Alliance Assurance founded in 1824. In 1996 Sun Alliance  merged with Royal Insurance to form the Royal & Sun Alliance Insurance Group.

The Horsham building, St Marks Court is earmarked as developable. In an external recess, to the market place (Carfax) side, is the tall spired tower of the church. Its nave was demolished in about 1985. The spire was part of the original church of 1841 constructed from sandstone. The tower's base has become a florist and volunteers’ centre.

Sun Alliance went on to acquire the London Assurance Company in 1965 (becoming Sun Alliance & London) and Phoenix Assurance in 1984. The company thus added suffix "Group" in 1989, consolidated most UK-based operations into the Horsham office in 1990, and yet kept its London head office. The company merged with Royal Insurance to form the Royal & Sun Alliance Insurance Group in 1996.

References

Insurance companies of the United Kingdom
Companies formerly listed on the London Stock Exchange
Financial services companies disestablished in 1996
British companies disestablished in 1996